Michel Riendeau (born 29 January 1955) is a Canadian rowing coxswain. He competed in the men's coxed pair event at the 1976 Summer Olympics.

References

1955 births
Living people
Canadian male rowers
Olympic rowers of Canada
Rowers at the 1976 Summer Olympics
Rowers from Montreal
Coxswains (rowing)